Tannbach is a German television series that first aired on ZDF in 2015. It is a fictionalized story inspired by the village of  Mödlareuth and its families that were divided by the Iron Curtain along a brook known as the Tannbach. The series explores the traumatic period of German history between the end of World War II and 1952. For the people of the village, the end of the war does not mean the end of hardship, soon the Cold War takes over and the village as well as the people become divided along geographic and political lines. The series has 2 seasons and is known as "Line of Separation" in the United States. "Line of Separation" was picked up by PBS as a streaming offering.

Main cast
 Heiner Lauterbach as Georg von Striesow
 Natalia Wörner as Caroline von Striesow
 Henriette Confurius as Anna von Striesow
 Nadja Uhl as Liesbeth Erler
 Jonas Nay as Friedrich Erler
 Ludwig Trepte as Lothar Erler
 Martina Gedeck as Hilde Vöckler
 David Zimmerschied as Horst Vöckler
 Alexander Held as Franz Schober
 Florian Brückner as Heinrich Schober
 Maximilian Brückner as Gustl Schober
 Johanna Bittenbinder as Kathi Schober
 Maria Dragus as Theresa Prantl
 Senta Auth as Lisa Prantl
 Inga Busch as Cilly Imhoff
 Jonathan Berlin as Walter Imhoff
 Ronald Zehrfeld as Konrad Werner

References

External links

2010s German television miniseries
Television series set in the 1940s
Television series set in the 1950s
2015 German television series debuts
2015 German television series endings
German-language television shows
ZDF original programming